Uns're Heimat may refer to;
The concept of Heimat
Unsere Heimat, a communist song about nature
Uns're Heimat, Uns're Liebe, a football chant
"Ons Heemecht", the national anthem of Luxembourg